GIScience & Remote Sensing (formerly Mapping Sciences and Remote Sensing and Geodesy, Mapping and Photogrammetry) is an academic journal published by Routledge about geographic information science and remote sensing. Routledge acquired GIScience & Remote Sensing from former publisher Bellwether Publishing in 2013. 
Its 2018 impact factor is 3.588

References

Geography journals
Remote sensing journals
Taylor & Francis academic journals
Geographic information science